Children of a Lesser God is the second album by the Wu-Tang Clan-affiliated American rap group Wisemen, released on October 26, 2010 on Babygrande Records.

Track listing
"Intro"
"Children of a Lesser God"
Produced by Bronze Nazareth
"Thirsty Fish"
Featuring Raekwon
Produced by Kevlaar 7
"Faith Doctrine"
Featuring Beace
"Interlude: Don't Nut on My Bed!"
"Lucy"
"Get U Shot"
"Hurt Lockers"
"The Illness 2"
"Words from Big Rube"
Featuring Big Rube of The Dungeon Family
"I Gotta Know"
"Listen to the Wisemen"
Featuring Minister Watson
"Panic in Vision Park"
"Do It Again"
Produced by Supaa Maine
"Interlude - Toxic"
"Makes Me Want a Shot"
"Victorious Hoods"
Featuring Victorious and Planet Asia
"Corn Liquor Thoughts"
"Outro - Hip Hop Blues"

2010 albums
Babygrande Records albums
Bronze Nazareth albums
Albums produced by Bronze Nazareth